Thoughts and Prayers is a 2015 Netflix stand-up comedy special by American comic Anthony Jeselnik, his first Netflix stand-up special for Netflix. In Thoughts and Prayers, directed by Adam Dubin in San Francisco, Anthony Jeselnik talks about death, animal cruelty, serial killing and more.

Cast
 Anthony Jeselnik

Release
Anthony Jeselnik: Thoughts and Prayers was released on October 16, 2015 on Netflix.

Reception
Anthony Jeselnik: Thoughts and Prayers received critical acclaim, with many critics highlighting the eponymous track and Jeselnik's delivery of serious topics.

References

External links
 
 
 

2015 television specials
Netflix specials
Stand-up comedy concert films
2015 comedy films